Innocence is the fifth studio album by Japanese recording artist Arisa Mizuki, released through Avex Tune on November 17, 1999. It is Mizuki's first studio album in over four years, since Cute, and the first to be released under Avex Tune. The album produced four original singles: "Through the Season," "Oh Darling" (released under the alias Convertible), "Asahi no Ataru Hashi," and Eternal Message. All singles, as well as track three of the album, "All My Love," which was used in commercials for the TU-KA cell phone by KDDI, had a commercial tie-in. Innocence is predominantly a pop music album. CDJournal noted that the album "showcases the vocals of a grown-up Mizuki."

Innocence debuted at number 39 on the Oricon Weekly Albums chart with 6,920 copies in its first week, charting eighteen spots lower than Cute.

Commercial performance 
Innocence debuted on the Oricon Weekly Albums chart at number 39 with 6,290 copies sold in its first week. The album charted for two weeks and has sold a total of 10,020 copies.

Track listing

Charts and sales

References 

1999 albums
Alisa Mizuki albums
Avex Group albums
Japanese-language albums